The Department of the Capital Territory was an Australian government department that existed between December 1972 and March 1983.

Scope
Information about the department's functions and/or government funding allocation could be found in the Administrative Arrangements Orders, the annual Portfolio Budget Statements and in the Department's annual reports.

According to the Administrative Arrangements Order (AAO) made on 20 December 1972, the Department dealt with:
Administration of the Australian Capital Territory, the Jervis Bay Territory, Norfolk Island and the Coral Sea Islands Territory.

Structure
The Department was an Australian Public Service department, staffed by officials who were responsible to the Minister for the Capital Territory.

List of ministers

References

Australia, Capital Territory
Capital Territory